Sandalu Thalen Eha is a 2008 Sri Lankan Sinhala action thriller film directed and produced by Gamini Pushpakumara for Super Films. It stars Jagath Benaragama and Asela Jayakody in lead roles along with G.R Perera and Buddhika Indurugalla. Music composed by Chaminda Malan. The film recorded as the first all-male Sri Lankan movie to be screened. It is the 1110th Sri Lankan film in the Sinhala cinema.

Plot

Cast
 Jagath Benaragama
 G.R Perera
 Asela Jayakody
 Buddhika Indurugalla
 Mapalagama Wimalaratne
 Kapila Sigera
 Podinilame Dedunu Pitiya
 Dilip Wickramasinghe
 Chamikara Bokaragoda
 Kumara Ranepura
 Vathika Perera

References

2008 films
2000s Sinhala-language films